John Barclay Armstrong (January 1, 1850 – May 1, 1913) was a Texas Ranger lieutenant and a United States Marshal. He is usually remembered for his role in the pursuit and capture of the famous gunfighter John Wesley Hardin.

Armstrong was born in McMinnville, Tennessee, son of Dr. John B. Armstrong and Maria Susannah Ready on January 1, 1850. Among notable relatives were his maternal grandfather Charles Ready, a U.S. Representative from Tennessee and his cousin Confederate States Army Brigadier General John Hunt Morgan. After living in Arkansas and Missouri for a short time, Armstrong moved to Austin, Texas in 1871. In 1875, after a brief stint as a lawman, he joined the Special Force under Captain Leander H. McNelly, a newly created quasi-military branch of the Texas Rangers that was to operate in southern Texas. His role as McNelly's second in command and right hand man earned him the promotion to sergeant and the nickname "McNelly's Bulldog".

With the death of McNelly and the absorption of the Special Force by the Texas Rangers' Frontier Battalion in 1876, Armstrong was promoted to Lieutenant. He was involved in several notable cases, like the capture of Hardin and the pursuit and killing of noted bank robber Sam Bass.

Armstrong resigned his position at the Rangers in 1881, and was appointed as a U.S. Marshal shortly afterwards. He established himself in Willacy County, Texas, where he founded a very large ranch. He died at his home in Armstrong, Texas, on May 1, 1913.

The ranch was later reorganized into Kenedy County, Texas

Films

The film Texas Rangers (2001) portrays the exploits of Armstrong, who is played by actor Robert Patrick.

External links

John Barclay Armstrong  from the Texas Ranger Hall of Fame Online

Members of the Texas Ranger Division
United States Marshals
People from McMinnville, Tennessee
1850 births
1913 deaths
People from Kenedy County, Texas